Jeffrey Hugh Staggs was an American college and professional football player who played for the San Diego State Aztecs and San Diego Chargers.

Early life 
Staggs was born in Elgin, Illinois and raised in San Diego County. After graduating from Point Loma High School, he attended Brigham Young University and San Diego City College.

Career

College 
For two years, Staggs played college football at San Diego State University under coach Don Coryell, where he was a linebacker on the Aztecs' winning the Camellia Bowl in 1966 and was inducted into the Hall of Fame in 2009.

Professional 
Staggs played professionally in the American Football League and the National Football League for the San Diego Chargers (1967–1972 and 1974) and the St. Louis Cardinals (1973). He was traded along with a second rounder in 1972 and a second and third rounder in 1973 from the Chargers to the Rams for Deacon Jones, Lee White and Greg Wojcik on January 29, 1972.

Personal life 
Staggs died in his sleep on September 17, 2014. After his death, Staggs's brain was donated to the Boston University CTE Center and Brain Bank, where it was found that he had suffered from chronic traumatic encephalopathy (CTE). In 2018, a wrongful death lawsuit was filed on behalf of Staggs and other football players against the National Collegiate Athletic Association.

See also
Other American Football League players

References

San Diego Chargers players
St. Louis Cardinals (football) players
San Diego State Aztecs football players
1944 births
2014 deaths
Point Loma High School alumni
American Football League players